Coccinella monticola, commonly called the mountain lady beetle or Tamarack ladybug, is a species of lady beetle native to the western United States and Canada, south-eastern Canada and New England states.

Description
It is a fairly recognizably species having two similar oval spots on either elytral, along with a single spot behind the head. The spots vary in size and roundedness. Though the forewings are generally red, they can be orange or yellow. This species can be confused with Coccinella difficilis but it differs with having the first set of elytra being smaller than the second.

Range
Coccinella monticola can be found from the Yukon Territory south to New Mexico with Washington and Wisconsin being the berth of the range. A small population can be found from the Great Lakes to Nova Scotia and Massachusetts.

References

Coccinellidae